Parmacelloidea is a superfamily of air-breathing land slugs, terrestrial pulmonate gastropod mollusks in the clade Stylommatophora and the informal group Pulmonata. These are limacoid or keelback slugs.

Families

Families within the superfamily Parmacelloidea include:
 Parmacellidae
 Milacidae
 Trigonochlamydidae

Cladogram
The following cladogram shows the phylogenic relationships of this superfamily to the other superfamilies and families within the limacoid clade:

References

Stylommatophora
Gastropod superfamilies